Almog Cohen (born 1 September 1988) is an Israeli former professional footballer who works as sporting director for Israeli Premier League side Maccabi Netanya.

Early life
Cohen was born in Be'er Sheva, Israel, to a Sephardic Jewish family.

Career
Cohen began his career with Beitar Tubruk and signed for Maccabi Netanya in summer 2006. In February 2010, Maccabi Netanya confirmed that he was set to join 1. FC Nürnberg in the 2010 summer transfer window. He made his league debut for the club on the third day of the 2010–11 Bundesliga season, starting Nürnberg's match at Hamburger SV. Coincidentally, his debut goal in the Bundesliga was also against Hamburg, Nürnberg won the game 2–0 with Cohen scoring the second goal of the match.

He spent five months on loan at Hapoel Tel Aviv in 2013.

On 30 July 2013, he joined FC Ingolstadt 04 on a three-year contract. On 22 April 2016, he extended his contract until 2018.

On 25 June 2019, Cohen returned to Maccabi Netanya on a four-year contract.

On 14 February 2022, Cohen retired from playing after struggling with injuries and became Maccabi Netanya's new sporting director.

International career
Cohen represented the Israel U21 national team and the senior side.

Career statistics

Club

International

Honours
Maccabi Netanya
 Israeli Premier League runner-up: 2006–07, 2007–08

FC Ingolstadt
 2. Bundesliga:  2014–15

References

External links
Almog Cohen at One 
National team stats at IFA

1988 births
Living people
Israeli Sephardi Jews
Israeli footballers
Footballers from Beersheba
Association football midfielders
Israel international footballers
Israeli Premier League players
Bundesliga players
2. Bundesliga players
Maccabi Netanya F.C. players
Beitar Nes Tubruk F.C. players
1. FC Nürnberg players
Hapoel Tel Aviv F.C. players
FC Ingolstadt 04 players
Israeli people of Moroccan-Jewish descent
Israeli expatriate footballers
Expatriate footballers in Germany
Israeli expatriate sportspeople in Germany